Sugarloaf Mills, formerly Discover Mills, is a  single story shopping mall in exurban Atlanta, located in Gwinnett County, Georgia, near the interchange of Interstate 85 and Highway 316. Opened in 2001, the mall features 13 anchors, over 150 specialty retailers as well as a variety of theme restaurants, casual dining and entertainment venues.

History 
The mall opened in November 2001, originally as an outlet mall, but began to evolve into an entertainment mall, with the additions of AMC Sugarloaf Mills 18 on December 17, 2003, and Medieval Times on July 21, 2006. The mall is notable in that it had granted naming rights to interested companies, and was one of the first malls in the United States to do so. The Mills Corporation, the original owner of the mall, had granted the naming rights to Discover Card, and thus originally given the name Discover Mills as well as the tag line "Where Discover Card Is The Smart Choice".    Simon Property Group is the current owner of Discover Mills from the Mills Corporation's acquisition.  In October 2012, the 10-year naming rights with Discover Card ended, and the mall was renamed Sugarloaf Mills. This was the mall's planned name when it was first developed in the late 1990s, named after the parkway the mall is located on.

Gallery

References

2001 establishments in Georgia (U.S. state)
Buildings and structures in Gwinnett County, Georgia
Outlet malls in the United States
Shopping malls established in 2001
Shopping malls in Georgia (U.S. state)
Shopping malls in the Atlanta metropolitan area
Tourist attractions in Gwinnett County, Georgia